Red Alone is a solo piano album by jazz musician Red Garland, recorded in 1960 and released the same year on Prestige Records, originally as part of the Moodsville series.

Track listing 
"When Your Lover Has Gone" (Einar Aaron Swan) - 6:45
"These Foolish Things (Remind Me of You)" (Jack Strachey, Holt Marvell, Harry Link) - 5:08
"My Last Affair" (Haven Johnson) - 3:39
"You Are Too Beautiful" (Richard Rodgers, Lorenz Hart) - 4:45
"I Got It Bad (And That Ain't Good)" (Duke Ellington, Paul Francis Webster) - 7:09
"The Nearness of You" (Hoagy Carmichael, Ned Washington) - 5:04
"Nancy (With the Laughing Face)" (Jimmy Van Heusen, Phil Silvers) - 5:25
"When I Fall in Love" (Victor Young, Edward Heyman) - 5:06

Personnel 
 Red Garland - piano

References 

1960 albums
Albums produced by Esmond Edwards
Albums recorded at Van Gelder Studio
Moodsville Records albums
Red Garland albums
Solo piano jazz albums